Morrell Point''' is the northernmost point on the west coast of Thule Island in the South Sandwich Islands. It was named by the UK Antarctic Place-Names Committee in 1971 for Benjamin Morrell, a sealer of Stonington, Connecticut, who visited the island in the Wasp'' in 1823.

References

External links

Headlands of South Georgia and the South Sandwich Islands